Fremont may refer to:

Places 
In the United States:
Fremont, California - largest city with the name
Fremont station
Fremont station (BART)
Fremont Central Park
Fremont, Yolo County, California
 Fremont, Illinois
Fremont Center, Illinois
Fremont, Indiana
Fremont, Iowa
Fremont, Michigan
Fremont, Missouri
Fremont, Nebraska
Fremont, New Hampshire
Fremont, Steuben County, New York
Fremont, Sullivan County, New York
Fremont, North Carolina
Fremont, Ohio
Fremont, Utah
Fremont, Virginia
Fremont, Seattle, Washington
Fremont, Wisconsin, village in Waupaca County
Fremont, Clark County, Wisconsin, town
Fremont, Waupaca County, Wisconsin, town

People 
 John C. Frémont (1813–1890), American explorer and botanist
 Fremont (name), a surname and given name

Other uses 
Fremont culture, an archaeological Native American culture
Fremont Hotel and Casino, a hotel/casino on Fremont Street in downtown Las Vegas, Nevada
Fremont Point transmitting station, a transmitter in Jersey
Fremont River (Utah), a tributary of the Colorado River
The Fremont Troll, a statue in Seattle, Washington
Fremont Unified School District, Fremont, California
Fremont (film), a 2023 drama film
"Fremont," codename for a Microsoft project in classified advertising
Fiat Freemont, Italian version of a Dodge Journey, an American automobile (SUV model)
Populus fremontii Fremont Cottonwood, a type of tree found in the Southwest U.S. and northern Mexico

See also 
Frémont (disambiguation)
Fremont Bridge (disambiguation)
Fremont County  (disambiguation)
Fremont High School (disambiguation)
Fremont Pass (disambiguation)
Fremont Township (disambiguation)